Tourmakeady College (Colaiste Mhuire) is an Irish-speaking voluntary secondary school in Tourmakeady, County Mayo, Ireland.

Colaiste Mhuire may also refer to:

 Coláiste Mhuire, part of the Marino Institute of Education, affiliated with Trinity College, Dublin
 Colaiste Mhuire, Dublin
 Coláiste Mhuire, Mullingar, County Westmeath, Ireland
 Mary Immaculate College (Coláiste Mhuire gan Smál), Limerick, Ireland

See also
 Mhuire (disambiguation)
 Scoil Mhuire (disambiguation)